Wang Fei (born 6 August 1981 in Henan) is a female Chinese beach volleyball player, who won the bronze medal in the women's beach team competition at the 2005 Beach Volleyball World Championships in Berlin, Germany, partnering Tian Jia. She first represented her country at the 2016 Summer Olympics in Rio, Brazil.

References

External links
 
 

1981 births
Living people
Chinese female beach volleyball players
Beach volleyball players at the 2004 Summer Olympics
Olympic beach volleyball players of China
Beach volleyball players at the 2002 Asian Games
Asian Games medalists in beach volleyball
Sportspeople from Luoyang
Asian Games gold medalists for China
Volleyball players from Henan
Medalists at the 2002 Asian Games